The 2020 Ontario Liberal Party leadership election concluded on March 7, 2020, resulting in the election of Steven Del Duca, a former cabinet minister in the government of Kathleen Wynne, as Ontario Liberal Party’s 33rd leader.

The leadership election took place following the resignation of Kathleen Wynne after over five years at the helm of the party. Her resignation took place on the evening of June 7, 2018, after the majority government led by her was defeated in the 2018 election and the party lost official party status.

The leadership election featured six candidates: former cabinet ministers Del Duca, Michael Coteau, and Mitzie Hunter, former provincial election candidates Kate Graham and Alvin Tedjo, and political newcomer Brenda Hollingsworth.  The election was concluded with a delegated convention that took place March 6–7, 2020 at the International Centre in Mississauga.

Background

Lead up to the 2018 Election 
After securing an upset leadership victory in 2013, Kathleen Wynne won a fourth consecutive mandate for the Ontario Liberal Party in June 2014 by marketing herself as a fresh face for the Liberals who would distance the party from Dalton McGuinty. However, the Liberals' standing with voters was badly hurt when Wynne’s government partially privatized Hydro One in 2015, after campaigning against it in the 2014 election, as well as rising criticism over "ballooning provincial debt, high electricity prices and costly, politically expedient decisions". The party headed into the 2018 election campaign trailing far behind the Progressive Conservatives. In the two years leading up to the 2018 campaign, the Liberals trailed the Progressive Conservatives in all but three of the more than eighty opinion polls published. 

With the party’s electoral fortune declining, there were public calls for Wynne’s resignation as early as spring 2017, most notably from former finance minister and campaign chair Greg Sorbara (under whom Wynne served as campaign vice-chair in 2011). Wynne consistently resisted the calls.  Throughout the 2018 election campaign, the Liberals polled consistently in third place behind not only the Progressive Conservatives but also the New Democrats.  CBC’s poll tracker projected zero to two seats (out of 124) for the Liberals at multiple points of the election campaign. 

At the conclusion of the campaign, the Liberals elected only seven MPPs, losing official party status in the Legislature. It was the worst electoral result in the party's 161-year history and the worst result for any incumbent governing party in Ontario.  On the night of the election, Wynne announced her resignation as party leader, while continuing to sit in the legislature as MPP for Don Valley West.

Interim leader 
Wynne announced on election night that she had asked the party president to begin the process of choosing an interim leader. According to the party's constitution, an interim leader is to be selected by a vote of the party caucus, the presidents of riding associations without an elected Liberal MPPs and party executive members. With four of the remaining seven caucus members actively contemplating leadership bids, one being in poor health, and one being the outgoing leader, the Liberal caucus quickly endorsed the seventh member, Ottawa South MPP John Fraser, to serve as interim leader on June 13, 2018. Fraser assumed the office of interim leader on June 14, following a ratification vote of party executives and presidents of riding associations for the remaining 117 ridings that do not have a Liberal MPP.

Rules and procedures 
Under the procedure outlined by the party's constitution, all members of the Ontario Liberal Party are eligible to cast a two-part ballot at one of the "Leadership Election Meetings" held across the province. Members vote directly for their choice of leadership candidate (or for "independent") in the top part of the ballot, and for local delegates for the leadership convention in the bottom part of the ballot. Elected delegates were apportioned to leadership candidates based on their share of votes in the top part of the ballot, and are bounded to vote for their leadership candidates on the first ballot at the leadership convention. The small number of independent delegates elected can vote for whomever they chose at the convention.

The delegates of the leadership convention made up of approximately 2000 elected delegates (16 delegates elected by members from each of the 124 electoral districts, 8 delegates from each Ontario Young Liberals campus clubs, 1 delegate from each Ontario Women Liberals Commission clubs) and more than 500 ex-officio delegates (by virtue of party and elected offices they have held, such as sitting and former Liberal MPPs, recent provincial Liberal candidates, sitting federal Liberal MPs, and various party officials and representatives of party bodies). Balloting at convention continues until one candidate receives a majority of ballots cast.

At the party's Annual General Meeting held on June 8, 2019, an organized attempt was made to amend the party constitution to change the leadership election system to eliminate the delegated convention and adopted a weighted One Member One Vote point system similar to the ones used by the Progressive Conservatives and the federal Liberal Party. The amendment was supported by 57% of delegates, but failed to receive the two-thirds majority required for it to pass. The 2020 leadership election marked the last time that this system was used, as the new system passed in 2023.

Leadership Campaign

Early campaigning
Given the weak polling numbers during the final years of the Wynne government, there was frequent chatter about the leadership aspirations of various cabinet members and MPPs. The names most frequently discussed were of finance minister Charles Sousa, health minister Eric Hoskins (both 2013 leadership contenders), Attorney General Yasir Naqvi (party president at the time of the 2013 leadership election), transport minister Steven Del Duca (co-chair of the 2013 leadership convention), and backbench MPP Yvan Baker.

With Sousa, Del Duca, Naqvi and Baker all losing their seats and Hoskins leaving provincial politics, the likely slate of candidates became uncertain after the 2018 election. In the latter half of 2018, four former ministers who survived the election, Michael Coteau, Mitzie Hunter, Marie-France Lalonde, and Nathalie Des Rosiers, actively explored their candidacies, while the candidacies of Del Duca, Naqvi, and Baker continued to be frequently speculated. Baker and Lalonde later opted to seek federal seats (both successful). Des Rosiers left politics to become principal of Massey College, while Naqvi became CEO of Institute for Canadian Citizenship. Del Duca briefly sought the chair-ship of York Region until the election was cancelled by the Ford government. Adam Vaughan and Mark Holland, two relatively high-profile MPs, both publicly acknowledged that they contemplated and subsequently ruled out bids, opting to seek re-election federally.

Formal campaign
On April 3, 2019, Del Duca formally declared his candidacy, the first candidate to do so. This was prior to the party’s annual general meeting in June where amendment proposals to the leadership rules were being debated. Del Duca refrained from taking positions on any of the amendment proposals, citing perceived conflict of interests. Alvin Tedjo, a former political aide and provincial election candidate, declared his candidacy in late May. An organized “draft Chris Hadfield” movement was present at the party’s annual meeting, even though the former astronaut at no point expressed any inclination to enter politics. 

Following the annual meeting, the party announced that it would formally “call” the leadership contest (a legal requirement imposed by the legislation) on July 18, 2019, that candidate registration deadline would be on November 25, 2019, and that the contest would conclude at a convention on March 7, 2020. It also announced an entrance fee of $100,000 (including $25,000 refundable deposit) and a spending limit of $900,000.  

Coteau announced his candidacy soon after the party’s annual meeting in June, while Hunter formally joined the race in early August. Kate Graham, a university instructor and former provincial election candidate, joined the race in September. Kyle Peterson, outgoing MP for Newmarket-Aurora, and Arthur Potts, a former MPP, both commenced bids in the fall of 2019, but ended their bids prior to formally launching their campaigns. Ottawa lawyer Brenda Hollingsworth, a political newcomer, joined the race on the registration deadline, rounding out the field of six. 

The party organized six debates among the candidates, held in Guelph (December 8), Windsor (December 12), Sudbury (January 12),  Ottawa (January 20), Markham (February 1) and Toronto (February 24).  All six debates were livestreamed on the party’s website. In addition, the Empire Club of Canada hosted a debate on January 15, and TVO hosted a televised debate on February 19.

The party imposed membership cut-off for voting eligibility for December 2, 2019.  At the cut-off, Del Duca claimed to have recruited 14,173 members while Coteau, Hunter and Tedjo claimed 8500, 2000 and 1000 respectively. The party later disclosed that 37,831 members in total were eligible to vote. 

Del Duca was seen as the frontrunner throughout the campaign. It was generally agreed that he had the most robust ground organization and most experienced campaign team. He also received by-far the largest share of endorsements from elected and party officials, with more public endorsements from former and current MPPs and MPs than the other five candidates combined. Coteau, with the longest tenure in the legislature and cabinet, pitched himself as the primary rival to Del Duca, and was generally viewed as seeking to reform the party. Graham, a political newcomer who campaigned to “change how we do politics”, also put forward a competitive campaign with the endorsements of former Deputy Premier Deb Matthews and a number other prominent figures seen as close to Wynne.

Del Duca’s frontrunner status was cemented after the February 8–9, 2020 weekend, during which party members throughout the province voted at local leadership election meetings. Del Duca earned over 55% of the elected delegates, won the most votes in 89 of 124 ridings, and led delegate counts in all regions of the province. Coteau was in second, with Graham a distant third place, earning 18% and 13% of the delegate respectively.  With strong second place showing in Southwestern Ontario (which voted on Saturday of the weekend), Graham actually led Coteau on delegate count after the first day of voting. Coteau re-gained second place by the end of the weekend, with stronger showing in Toronto and Eastern Ontario (which voted on Sunday).

Despite the outcome of the leadership election being a virtual certainty leading up to the convention, about 3,000 people attended the two-day event, co-chaired by Deputy Prime Minister Chrystia Freeland and interim leader John Fraser. On March 7, 2020, Del Duca was formally elected leader on the first ballot with 59% of the ballot cast.

Registered candidates

Steven Del Duca

Background: Former MPP for Vaughan (2012-2018), Former Minister of Economic Development and Growth (2018) and Minister of Transportation (2014-2018).
Date announced: April 3, 2019 
Date registered with Elections Ontario:  July 19, 2019
Campaign website:

Michael Coteau

Background:  MPP for Don Valley East (since 2011) and Liberal critic for Economic Development, Labour, Energy, and Infrastructure; former Minister of Community and Social Services (2018), Minister of Children and Youth Services and minister responsible for anti-racism (2016-2018), Minister of Tourism, Culture, and Sport and minister responsible for the 2015 Pan American Games and Parapan Games (2014-2016), and Minister of Citizenship and Immigration (2013-2014); former Toronto District School Board trustee for Ward 17 (2003-11); former small business owner and national nonprofit CEO. 
Date announced: June 16, 2019 
Date registered with Elections Ontario:  July 24, 2019
Campaign website:

Kate Graham 

Background: 2018 candidate in London North Centre, former civil servant at City of London, instructor at Western University
Date announced: September 7, 2019
Date registered with Elections Ontario:  August 23, 2019
Campaign website:

Brenda Hollingsworth
Background: Ottawa personal injury lawyer
Date announced: November 25, 2019
Date registered with Elections Ontario:  
Campaign website:

Mitzie Hunter

Background: MPP for Scarborough—Guildwood (since 2013), former Minister of Advanced Education and Skills Development (2018), Minister of Education (2016-2018), and Associate Minister of Finance (2014-2016). If Hunter had been the victor she would have been the first black leader of a Major Political Party in Canada both on a federal and provincial level.
Date announced: August 14, 2019
Date registered with Elections Ontario:  August 20, 2019
Campaign website:

Alvin Tedjo

Background: 2018 candidate in Oakville North—Burlington, former director of Government Relations for Sheridan College, former political staff to multiple Ministers of Training, Colleges and Universities
Date announced: May 27, 2019
Date registered with Elections Ontario:  August 23, 2019
Campaign website:

Declined

Declared intention to party officials, with representatives attended at least one campaign representatives meetings
Kyle Peterson, former federal Liberal MP for Newmarket—Aurora (2015-2019)
Arthur Potts, former MPP for Beaches—East York (2014-2018) and Parliamentary Assistant to the Minister of Agriculture, Food and Rural Affairs.

Has taken exploratory steps
Yvan Baker, current federal Liberal MP for Etobicoke Centre (2019-), former MPP for Etobicoke Centre (2014-2018), and former Parliamentary Assistant to the Minister of Finance
Bonnie Crombie, former federal MP for Mississauga—Streetsville (2008-2011), Mayor of Mississauga (2014–present)
Nathalie Des Rosiers, former Minister of Natural Resources and Forestry and MPP for Ottawa—Vanier from 2016-2019, and previously general counsel for the Canadian Civil Liberties Association (2009-2013). Announced May 2019 that she was leaving politics to become principal of Massey College.
Mark Holland, federal Liberal MP for Ajax since 2015, MP for Ajax—Pickering (2004-2011), Parliamentary Secretary to the Minister of Public Safety and Emergency Preparedness
Marie-France Lalonde, MPP for Orléans 2014-2019 and former Minister of Community Safety and Correctional Services. Announced in May 2019 that she intends to run for the federal Liberal nomination in Orléans. 
Michael Lublin, entrepreneur, former Doug Ford supporter.
Yasir Naqvi, CEO of Institute for Canadian Citizenship and former Attorney General of Ontario and MPP for Ottawa Centre (2007–2018)
Adam Vaughan, federal Liberal MP for Spadina—Fort York since 2014, previously a Toronto City Councillor (2006-2014)

Speculated, but no reported exploratory effort
Dwight Duncan, former Minister of Finance and Deputy Premier under Dalton McGuinty, former MPP for successive Windsor, Ontario ridings (1995-2013), third place leadership candidate in 1996, currently senior strategic advisor at McMillan LLP
Chris Hadfield, astronaut, musician and pilot in the Royal Canadian Air Force
David Henderson, 2018 Liberal candidate in Leeds—Grenville—Thousand Islands and Rideau Lakes. After Wynne's admission that the Liberals would not win the provincial election, Henderson announced he would run for Liberal leader if he was elected. He was defeated on election day.
Eric Hoskins, leadership candidate in 2013, former Ontario Minister of Health and Long Term Care and former MPP for St. Paul's (2009–2018)
Jennifer Keesmaat, former Chief City Planner of Toronto and 2018 Toronto mayoral election candidate.
Jeff Lehman, Mayor of Barrie, economist and development expert.
John Milloy, former Minister of Government Services for Kathleen Wynne, former Government House Leader, Minister of Training, Colleges & Universities, Minister of Community & Social Services, and Minister of Research & Innovation for Dalton McGuinty, former MPP for Kitchener Centre (2003-2014), practitioner-in-residence at Wilfrid Laurier University
Tim Murphy, former Liberal MPP (St. George—St. David, 1993-1995), former president of the Ontario Liberal Party, former Liberal provincial election campaign co-chair, former chief of staff to Prime Minister Paul Martin (2003-2006).
Jane Philpott, former federal cabinet minister (2017-2019) and former MP for Markham—Stouffville (2015-2019). Resigned from federal Liberal cabinet to protest the SNC-Lavalin affair.
Sandra Pupatello, leadership runner-up in 2013, former Chair of Hydro One, former MPP for Windsor West (1995–2011) and former Minister of Community and Social Services and Minister of Education under Dalton McGuinty. Announced that she will not be returning to provincial politics and will seek the federal Liberal nomination in Windsor West for the 2019 federal election.
Charles Sousa, leadership candidate in 2013, former Ontario Minister of Finance and former MPP for Mississauga South (2007–2018)
Belinda Stronach, former federal MP for Newmarket—Aurora (2004-2008), former Federal Minister of Human Resources and Skills Development, President and Chair of The Stronach Group
John Tory, Mayor of Toronto (2014–present), leader of the Progressive Conservative Party of Ontario (2004-2009)
John Wilkinson, Minister of Research and Innovation, Minister of Revenue, and Minister of the Environment under Dalton McGuinty, former MPP for Perth—Middlesex (2003-2007) and Perth—Wellington (2007-2011)

Results

Local Voting

All members of the Ontario Liberal Party as of December 2, 2019 were eligible to cast a two-part ballot at one of the "Leadership Election Meetings" held across the province. Members vote directly for their choice of leadership candidate (or for "independent") in the top part of the ballot, and for local delegates in the bottom part of the ballot. Elected delegates were apportioned to leadership candidates based on their share of votes in the top part of the ballot, and are bounded to vote for their leadership candidates on the first ballot at the March 6 convention. The small number of independent delegates elected can vote for whomever they chose at the convention.

The meetings were held over the weekend of February 8–9, 2020 in 119 electoral districts (with 5 additional electoral districts in Northern Ontario holding their balloting by mail/email/fax), and in twelve Ontario Young Liberal campus clubs and four Ontario Women's Liberal Clubs.  There were a total of 2,084 delegates spots up for election from Ontario's 124 electoral districts (16 each for a total of 1,984), twelve campus clubs (8 each for a total of 96) and four women's clubs (1 each for a total of 4).

The local results were as follow.

Result by Electoral Districts/Clubs

Convention 
The delegated leadership convention was held on March 6 and 7, 2020 at the International Centre in Mississauga. In addition to the 2000 plus pleaded delegates elected, approximately 530 ex-officio delegates were eligible to vote at the convention by virtue of party and elected offices they have held, such as sitting and former Liberal MPPs, recent provincial Liberal candidates, sitting federal Liberal MPs, and various party officials and representatives of party bodies.

Steven Del Duca was elected leader on the first ballot with 59% of the ballot cast.
There was one spoiled ballot.

Notes

References

Ontario Liberal Party leadership elections
Ontario
March 2020 events in Canada
Ontario Liberal Party leadership election